Gymnothorax randalli is a moray eel found in the Pacific and Indian Oceans. It was first named by Smith and Böhlke in 1997, and can reach a maximum length of approximately 36 centimetres.

References

randalli
Fish described in 1997